7-Methylxanthine (7-MX), also known as heteroxanthine, is an active metabolite of caffeine (1,3,7-trimethylxanthine) and theobromine (3,7-dimethylxanthine). It is a non-selective antagonist of the adenosine receptors. The compound may slow the progression of myopia (nearsightedness). It is under investigation for this purpose in children with myopia.

References 

Adenosine receptor antagonists
Experimental drugs
Human drug metabolites
Ophthalmology drugs
Xanthines